Streptomyces olivomycini is a bacterium species from the genus of Streptomyces.

See also 
 List of Streptomyces species

References

Further reading 
 

 -->

olivomycini
Bacteria described in 1991